This is a list of seasons completed by the UNLV Rebels football team of the National Collegiate Athletic Association (NCAA) Division I Football Bowl Subdivision (FBS). UNLV's first football team was fielded in 1968.

UNLV football began in 1968. After spending time in the Big West Conference between 1982–95, and the Western Athletic Conference between 1996–98, the Rebels joined the Mountain West Conference as one of the founding members in 1999, of which it has been a member since.

Seasons

References

UNLV

UNLV Rebels football seasons